"Champagne Problems" (stylized in all lowercase) is a song recorded by American singer-songwriter Taylor Swift. It is the second track on Swift's ninth studio album, Evermore, which was released on December 11, 2020, through Republic Records. Swift wrote the song with Joe Alwyn (under the pseudonym William Bowery) and produced it with Aaron Dessner. "Champagne Problems" is a lo-fi ballad written from the perspective of a troubled girlfriend who turns down her lover's earnest marriage proposal due to her own mental health struggles. The song depicts the narrator taking responsibility for the breakup and mourning the faded relationship. It is built around a guitar riff and oom-pah piano.

Upon Evermore release, "Champagne Problems" received critical acclaim for its vivid portrayal of heartbreak and mental health. In the United States, the song debuted at number 21 on the Billboard Hot 100, number 3 on the Billboard Hot Rock & Alternative Songs chart, and number seven on the Rolling Stone Top 100. Internationally, it charted at number six in Canada and Ireland and reached the top 20 on the Billboard Global 200 and in Australia, Malaysia, Singapore, and the United Kingdom. Swift performed "Champagne Problems" live for the first time on the Eras Tour in 2023.

Background and release
On July 24, 2020, during the COVID-19 lockdowns, Taylor Swift surprise-released her eighth studio album, Folklore, to widespread critical acclaim and commercial success. In September 2020, Swift and her co-producers and co-writers for the album, Aaron Dessner, Jack Antonoff, and Joe Alwyn, assembled at Long Pond Studio, located in a secluded cabin in upstate New York, to film the documentary Folklore: The Long Pond Studio Sessions. Released to Disney+ and accompanied by a live album released digitally, Swift performed the stripped-down renditions of all 17 tracks on Folklore and recounted the creative process of developing the album.

Swift wrote "Champagne Problems" song with Joe Alwyn (under the pseudonym William Bowery), who she has been in a romantic relationship with since 2016. Despite speculation that Swift wrote it about their own relationship, she explained that she and Alwyn wrote it together and detailed the writing process: "I say it was a surprise that we started writing together, but in a way, it wasn't, because we have always bonded over music and had the same musical tastes, and he's always the person who's showing me songs by artists and then they become my favorite songs or whatever. Joe and I really love sad songs. We've always bonded over music. So it was… We write the saddest [ones]. We just really love sad songs. What can I say?" She selected the song's bridge as one of her favorite parts of the song: "I'm so excited to one day be in front of a crowd when they all sing, 'She would have made such a lovely bride / What a shame she's fucked in the head.'"

On December 10, 2020, Swift announced that her ninth studio album and Folklore's sister album, Evermore, would come out at midnight and revealed its track listing, where "Champagne Problems" placed second. In the announcement, Swift teased imageries of various tracks, including "Champagne Problems", in which "two longtime college sweethearts had very different plans for the same night, one to end it and one who brought a ring." Lyric videos of each song on the album were released to Swift's YouTube channel; "Champagne Problems" has since garnered over 31 million views as of October 2022. In the video, the lyrics appear over a glass of champagne. The song was also included in The "Dropped Your Hand While Dancing" Chapter, a streaming compilation by Swift released by Swift on January 21, 2021, featuring four other songs from Evermore and one from Folklore.

Composition and lyrics 

"Champagne Problems" is a weepy ballad with spacious, lo-fi instrumentals, consisting of oompah piano chords that interlace with guitar arpeggios, and choir vocals. It is narrated by an apologetic girlfriend whose personal issues interfere with her romantic relationship, leading to her rejecting her lover's earnest marriage proposal, which takes places at a Christmas party. In the second verse, she sings "You told your family for a reason / You couldn't keep it in / Your sister splashed out on the bottle / Now no one's celebrating," alluding to the fact that the subject was so confident the narrator would say yes that they told their family beforehand. The song sees her take responsibility for the heartache caused and mourning the relationship while observing her former lover moving on. Jason Lipshutz of Billboard described the narrative as "a quiet sense of hurt growing louder as the song's story of a shriveled romance... turns more urgent." "Champagne Problems" also sees the narrator addressing her former lover from a second-person perspective: the song opens with the line "You booked the night train for a reason / So you could sit there in this hurt." Musically, the song is set in the key of C major with a tempo of 90 beats per minute. Swift's vocal span from E3 to G4.

Critical reception 
"Champagne Problems" received widespread critical acclaim. NME critic Hannah Mylrea juxtaposed "Champagne Problems" to Swift's 2008 hit "Love Story", with the latter being a song about accepting a marriage proposal while the former is about rejecting the same. Terming it a "disenchantment ballad", Madeline Crone of American Songwriter thought that, by the song's first chorus, it is "painstakingly apparent" how "different plans" play out between two lovers. Entertainment Weekly's Maura Johnston praised the song's "pointillistic" details, and underscored how the opening couplet "You booked the night train for a reason / So you could sit there in this hurt" accurately depicts "someone looking to escape from themselves, and not just their situation".

The Guardian Alexis Petridis said that the song, and more specifically the lyric "She would've made such a lovely bride / What a shame she's fucked in the head", was a partial callback to the "bad-news girlfriend" satirically depicted in Swift's 2014 single "Blank Space". Music journalist Jon Pareles, in The New York Times, wrote that the music on the track was "an elaborate, evolving sigh", highlighting lo-fi piano chords that progress to guitar chords in more rapid succession and looped "aah" vocals. Brodie Lancaster of The Sydney Morning Herald selected the song as an example of Swift's ability to write fictional characters and "write it until it's entirely wrung dry." Writing for The Independent, Helen Brown described the song as "wickedly fizzy" and praised Swift's character building.

Several critics, such as Patrick Ryan of USA Today, selected "Champagne Problems" as a highlight on Evermore. Bobby Olivier of Spin singled out the song as an "unskippable" highlight on Evermore, applauding its "addictive" depiction of a failed marriage proposal. Annie Zaleski of The A.V. Club pinpointed it as an example of Evermore's sonic cohesion and highly detailed lyricism, while Tom Breihan of Stereogum applauded the song's "loving, exacting detail."

Jason Lipshutz of Billboard similarly praised its lyrics and highlighted the complexity with which Swift explores themes such as marriage and adult love. Writing for Variety, Chris Willman described "Champagne Problems" as "a superb example of her abilities as a storyteller who doesn’t always tell all." Mikael Wood, in a review published in the Los Angeles Times, selected "Champagne Problems" as a highlight, opining that its lyrics hold "so much empathy that neither character ends up as the bad guy." According to Consequence, "Champagne Problems" has the best bridge in Evermore, containing Swift's best lyrics and performance in the album. Picked by Clash critics as one of Swift's 15 best songs, their listicle claimed that the bridge of "Champagne Problems" is "without a doubt some of Taylor's best work as it flows between metaphor and brutal honesty."

Commercial performance 

Upon Evermores release, all 15 tracks landed inside the top-75 of the Billboard Global 200 chart simultaneously, with "Champagne Problems" at number 12. In the United States, the song opened at number 21 on the Billboard Hot 100, and number 3 on the Hot Rock & Alternative Songs chart, where it became Swift's 17th top-10 entry and stayed for 20 weeks. "Champagne Problems" debuted at number 7 on the Rolling Stone Top 100, a chart similar to the Hot 100, with 152,700 units sold and 18.3 million streams. In Canada, it peaked at number 6 on the Canadian Hot 100, becoming her 31st top-10 entry and was certified gold by Music Canada. The song reached number 15 on UK Singles Chart and received a silver certification from the British Phonographic Industry (BPI). Elsewhere, "Champagne Problems" debuted on several single charts, peaking within the top-25 of Australia (12), Ireland (6), Malaysia (15), New Zealand (24), and Singapore (16), and further reaching Portugal (75), and Switzerland (92).

Impact
Inspired by the track, French luxury hotel Royal Champagne Hotel & Spa offered guests a new package called "Champagne Solution", which includes a bottle of Dom Pérignon, the champagne brand mentioned in the song's lyrics.

Credits and personnel
Credits adapted from Pitchfork.
 Taylor Swift − vocals, songwriting, production
 Aaron Dessner − production, recording, piano, synthesizer, acoustic guitar, synth bass
 William Bowery − songwriting
 Jonathan Low − vocal recording, mixing, recording
 Greg Calbi − mastering
 Steve Fallone − mastering
 Logan Coale − upright bass

Charts

Weekly charts

Year-end charts

Certifications

References

2020 songs
Song recordings produced by Taylor Swift
Songs written by Taylor Swift
Song recordings produced by Aaron Dessner
Taylor Swift songs
2020s ballads
Sentimental ballads
Songs about alcohol
Songs written by Joe Alwyn